This is a list of characters of the 2009–2010 Japanese tokusatsu drama Kamen Rider W, its manga sequel, Fuuto PI, and the latter's anime adaptation.

Main characters

Narumi Detective Office
The  is a private detective agency that specializes in Dopant activity and was founded by Sokichi Narumi, who was murdered while he and Shotaro were rescuing Philip and named Shotaro his successor.

Kamen Rider W
Kamen Rider W is the titular duo of Shotaro Hidari and Philip, who can fuse with each other and transform via the  belts and their own set of purified USB memory-like . Their Double Drivers are linked, such that Philip's consciousness is transferred into Shotaro's body along with the former's Gaia Memory. As such, W's ability to function is dependent on the condition of its components, as any physical or mental disruption could affect the Kamen Rider's mobility or cancel the transformation entirely. Alternatively, the HardBoilder can assume  for increased speed.

While they are also capable of performing a  finisher via both of their active Gaia Memories, doing so proves severely harmful to the body.

 : W's green/black-colored default form accessed from the Cyclone and Joker Memories. While transformed, they are capable of throwing wind-powered kicks that increase damage and cutting potential. Their Maximum Drives in this form are the  via the Joker Memory and an unnamed series of kicks via the Cyclone Memory.
 : A green/silver-colored Half Change accessed from the Cyclone and Metal Memories. While transformed, W can use the Metal Shaft to create bladed gusts. Their Maximum Drive in this form is the  via the Metal Memory.
 : A green/blue-colored Half Change accessed from the Cyclone and Trigger Memories. While transformed, W can use the Trigger Magnum to shoot compressed air. Their Maximum Drives in this form are the  via the Cyclone Memory and the  via the Trigger Memory.
 : W's red/silver-colored auxiliary form accessed from the Heat and Metal Memories. While transformed, they can imbue the Metal Shaft with fire to increase its destructive capabilities. Their Maximum Drive in this form is the  via the Metal Memory. This form first appears in the film Kamen Rider Decade: All Riders vs. Dai-Shocker.
 : A red/black-colored Half Change accessed from the Heat and Joker Memories. While transformed, W is capable of throwing flaming punches. Their Maximum Drives in this form are the  via the Joker Memory and the  via the Heat Memory. This form first appears in the film Kamen Rider Decade: All Riders vs. Dai-Shocker.
 : A red/blue-colored Half Change accessed from the Heat and Trigger Memories. While transformed, W can use the Trigger Magnum to shoot fireballs. Their Maximum Drive in this form is the  via the Trigger Memory.
 : W's gold/blue-colored auxiliary form accessed from the Luna and Trigger Memories. While transformed, they can use the Trigger Magnum to shoot homing projectiles. Their Maximum Drives in this form are the  via the Trigger Memory and the  via the Luna Memory.
 : A gold/black-colored Half Change accessed from the Luna and Joker Memories. While transformed, W is capable of stretching their right limbs to extend their strike range. Their Maximum Drive in this form is the  via the Joker Memory.
 : A gold/silver-colored Half Change accessed from the Luna and Metal Memories. While transformed, W can use the Metal Shaft like a whip. Their Maximum Drive in this form is the  via the Metal Memory.

W also uses , items powered by artificial Gaia Memories called  that change from their device-like  to their animal-like  and strengthen W's weapons with the use of a Soul Memory.

W normally uses a Stag Phone to summon and control the HardBoilder and the Revolgarry, but they can also attach it onto either the Trigger Magnum to perform the  Maximum Drive via the Trigger Memory or the Metal Shaft to perform the  Maximum Drive via the Metal Memory. With the Heat Memory, the Stag Phone can perform a weaker, unnamed Maximum Drive that engulfs it in flames to attack targets.
It has a grappling hook in Wrist Watch Mode and can also shoot trackers. When attached to the Trigger Magnum, it allows W to fire a net to capture Dopants. When attached to the Metal Shaft, it allows W to shoot webbed string to restrain Dopants.
A live video feed can be linked to the Stag Phone while in Bat Mode and its flash can disorient others. When attached to the Metal Shaft—a combination that Shotaro dubs the —it can emit sonic waves strong enough to shatter solid objects. When attached to the Trigger Magnum, it allows W to perform the  Maximum Drive via the Trigger Memory. With the Luna Memory, the Bat Shot can perform a weaker, unnamed Maximum Drive that reveals and stuns any hidden targets in its vicinity.
W primarily uses it for audio recording and analysis via its sound recorder, though it also contains a voice modulator.
Its primary ability is to detect changes in the light spectra and alert its user to targets invisible to the naked eye. It is also used as a surveillance device, being able to store eight terabytes of information in its Pseudo Memory.

If exposed to strong winds, Shotaro and Philip can transform further into  and perform the  Maximum Drive. Cyclone Joker Gold Xtreme first appears in the film Kamen Rider W Forever: A to Z/The Gaia Memories of Fate.

Shotaro Hidari
 is the man on the streets, a self-proclaimed "extremely hard-boiled private eye" who emulates famous pulp fiction private eye characters, dresses himself in 1940s fashion, and possesses a sharp intuition that allows him to occasionally deduce the culprit behind a crime before having Philip provide evidence to confirm his suspicions. Vowing to ensure that no one ever feels sad, Shotaro became a protégé of Fuuto's private investigator Sokichi Narumi after admiring his work as a child. Unlike his mentor, Shotaro was incapable of making tough decisions most of the time due to his kindhearted nature, which is the main reason why many consider him "half-boiled".

Following Sokichi's death and meeting Philip during the  incident, Shotaro promises to continue in his mentor's stead while becoming a man worthy of wearing Sokichi's white fedora. As such, Shotaro works to stop the Dopant crime wave in Fuuto by providing his body to Kamen Rider W, taking pride in the role and being called a "Kamen Rider" by the citizens. While his body was not meant to handle Gaia Memories as he was never intended to be partnered with Philip, Shotaro adapted to the situation as he eventually becomes worthy of being W and wearing Sokichi's fedora.

As W, Shotaro possesses Gaia Memories with gold tips called , which form the left half of W's body and determine the fighting style in conjunction with Philip's Soul Memories. They are also used in W's Maximum Drive attacks.
 : Allows the user to increase their fighting potential and significantly enhances their reflexes. Additionally, Shotaro can use it in conjunction with the Lost Driver to transform into  whenever Philip is unavailable. The latter form first appears in the film Kamen Rider W Forever: A to Z/The Gaia Memories of Fate.
 : Empowers the user with superhuman strength and enhanced resistance to physical harm. Forms using the Metal Memory arms W with the extendable  bō.
 : Turns the user into an expert marksman.

Philip
The mysterious  is Shotaro's partner in the detective agency who lost his memory, has a tendency for obsessively focusing on a specific topic of interest, and uses his special abilities to access the Gaia Library to solve Dopant crimes. He was originally , the third child and only son of the Sonozaki family who died after falling into the Earth's consciousness, the True , and revived as an ageless data human.

Initially a logic-driven sociopath with little common sense who constantly irks all around him, Philip gradually becomes more empathic while slowly learning of his former identity. He is eventually captured and absorbed by his sister Wakana Sonozaki to restore the Museum's hold on the True Gaia Memory. While he is later extracted by Shotaro, this event causes Philip's body to destabilize to the point where he risks breaking up into data and being absorbed by the Earth if he transforms into W again and cancels the transformation. Saving this final transformation to save Wakana and fight Jun Kazu, Philip has Shotaro promise to continue fighting for Fuuto after he is gone and leaves the Lost Driver to Shotaro as a parting gift.

However, after Wakana learns Philip sacrificed his own physical existence to save her, she sacrifices herself in turn to bring back the Xtreme Memory and reconstruct Philip's physical body. Before returning, Philip shares one last moment with his family, who tell him that they will be watching over him. Upon revealing himself a year later, Philip resumes protecting Fuuto with Shotaro.

As W, Philip possesses Gaia Memories with silver tips called , which transfer his consciousness into Shotaro's body and provides the right half of W's body and elemental powers.
 : Grants the user aerokinesis and superhuman speed. Forms using the Cyclone Memory possesses the  scarf. During the events of the novel Kamen Rider W: The One Who Continues After Z, Philip uses the Lost Driver and Cyclone Memory to transform into .
 : Grants the user pyrokinesis.
 : Allows the user to cast illusions, stretch their limbs or weapons, and bend gunshots.
 : A special Dromaeosaurid-like Gaia Memory built to protect Philip and act on his orders, able to change from Live Mode to Memory Mode. When Philip uses the Fang Memory, he becomes the main body while Shotaro's consciousness is transferred to him, allowing Philip to go out into the field and utilize W's power in case Shotaro is physically unable to. Originally, the form is treated as a last resort as the transformation is extremely taxing on Philip's frail body and renders him a berserker until Philip is fully revived in the series finale. Forms using the Fang Memory are able to produce bladed weapons on the body, such as the wrist-mounted  or the removable  boomerang. Unlike W's normal Half Changes, the Fang-based Half Changes cannot use their left half's Gaia Memory-based weapons.
 : W's white/black-colored super form accessed from the Fang and Joker Memories. Because of Shotaro's high synchronization with the Joker Memory, it keeps Fang from entering its berserk state as the Gaia Memory itself was initially suited for hand-to-hand combat prior to Philip's full revival in the series finale. This form first appears in the film Kamen Rider × Kamen Rider W & Decade: Movie War 2010.
 : A white/blue-colored Half Change accessed from the Fang and Trigger Memories. While transformed, W is capable of producing two Arm Sabers on both sides of their left half's wrist to serve as a bow that can fire energy arrows generated from the Fang Memory's horn while their right half can produce four claws from its metacarpal that can be used as mine trap-based projectiles. This form appears exclusively in the manga/anime sequel Fuuto PI.
 : A white/silver-colored Half Change accessed from the Fang and Metal Memories. While transformed, W is capable of producing spiked sabers on both sides of their forearms, upper arms, and shoulders. This form appears exclusively in the manga/anime sequel Fuuto PI.

Akiko Narumi
 is Shotaro's boss and head of the Narumi Detective Office with a black and white view of the world. She came to Fuuto from Osaka to find her father Sokichi and reclaim the agency's building, initially unaware that her father had died and was a Kamen Rider until the events of the film Kamen Rider × Kamen Rider W & Decade: Movie War 2010. In addition to being the boss, she serves as a personal assistant while on the job and keeps Shotaro on the right track. Despite her somewhat childish personality, she has shown signs of promise as a detective, particularly in her ability to decipher clues that leave Shotaro, Philip, and Ryu Terui stumped as well as being extremely protective of clients, a trait she shares with her father. Akiko harbors a crush on Terui, but her advances are initially ignored as he maintains a professional demeanor towards her until he eventually gives in to his own feelings for her. Despite this, she is ultimately torn due to unresolved issues with her father until the events of the film Kamen Rider × Kamen Rider OOO & W Featuring Skull: Movie War Core, where she learns Sokichi's full story before her wedding to Terui. During the events of the V-Cinema, Kamen Rider Accel, due to his inability to call her by name, Akiko believes that Terui does not love her, which is worsened further after she sees him on the run with Aoi Katsuragi and believes that he is cheating on her. After she is taken captive by the Commander Dopant and saved by her husband, Akiko learns that Terui truly loves her. Sometime between the events of Fuuto PI and the V-Cinema Drive Saga: Kamen Rider Chaser, Akiko gave birth to a daughter named .

Tokime
 is a mysterious, pink-haired amnesiac girl, thief, and formerly the  who possesses supernatural powers, believes herself to be a witch as such, and appears exclusively in the manga sequel Fuuto PI and its subsequent anime adaptation. Initially a suspect for a brutal killing spree before she is proven innocent and a target of the Street crime syndicate, she comes to work for the Narumi Detective Office as an assistant and gradually recovers her memories as a Street assassin codenamed "Witch".

With the Joker Memory and a Gaia Driver Rex, Tokime can transform into the Joker Dopant. While transformed, she can cover herself in a bio-energy aura for protection, solidify it into cards for offensive and defensive purposes, and trap targets inside human-sized cards.

Ryu Terui
 is the superintendent appointed to the Fuuto PD's , much to the chagrin of Shotaro, Jinno, and Makura. However, it is only after Isaka's death that Terui learns that there is more to the story behind the death of his family. Additionally, Terui comes to develop feelings for Akiko Narumi over the course of the series and eventually goes on to marry her during the sequel film Kamen Rider × Kamen Rider OOO & W Featuring Skull: Movie War Core and have a daughter named Haruna Terui with her in between the events of Fuuto PI and the Kamen Rider Drive V-Cinema Drive Saga: Kamen Rider Chaser.

Utilizing the  belt in conjunction with the  Memory, Terui can transform into Kamen Rider Accel. While transformed, he can perform the  Maximum Drive and convert into the motorcycle-like , which allows him to perform an unnamed Maximum Drive.

Similarly to W, Terui possesses the  Memory Gadget that can change from Cell Phone Mode to  via the  Memory and the tank-like  support robot that can operate on its own via its onboard A.I. and combine with W's HardBoilder to form the  half-track. When attached to W's Trigger Magnum, the Beetle Phone allows them to perform the  via the Trigger Memory.

 : The hovercraft-like combination of Accel Bike Form and the Revolgarry's Turbuler unit that grants flight capabilities. In this combination, he can perform an unnamed Maximum Drive.
 : A form accessed from the stopwatch-like  Memory that grants superhuman speed. His Maximum Drives in this form are the  via the Trial Memory in its Maximum Mode and the  via the Engine Blade.
 : A form accessed from the Accel Memory combined with the  device which grants additional armor and a plethora of miniature boosters that grant flight capabilities and increased mobility. His Maximum Drive in this form is the  via the Engine Blade. This form first appears in the V-Cinema sequel special Kamen Rider W Returns: Kamen Rider Accel.

Recurring characters

Sokichi Narumi
Sokichi's policy with investigations was to ensure the client's safety above all else, and unlike Shotaro, he was truly hardboiled in the sense that he would make difficult decisions when he needs to and follow through on them. During flashbacks depicted in the film Kamen Rider × Kamen Rider OOO & W Featuring Skull: Movie War Core, Sokichi became involved in Dopant cases and gained the means to become  from Shroud, an old friend of his. Sokichi accepted a job from Shroud to rescue Philip from the Sonozaki family. During the mission, Sokichi lost his Rider equipment while fighting the Taboo Dopant and sacrificed his Skull Memory to free Philip. After convincing Philip to come with him to decide his own fate and find his own atonement, Sokichi was shot in the back by the Sonozaki family's hired men and dies telling Shotaro to continue in his place and giving him his white fedora.

Utilizing the  belt in conjunction with the  Memory, Sokichi could transform into Kamen Rider Skull. To complete the transformation, he removes his fedora before putting it back on in his Rider form. Additionally, he could perform either an unnamed Maximum Drive on his own or the  Maximum Drive with the Skull Magnum in its Maximum Mode.

When he first received his Rider powers, Sokichi initially transformed into the incomplete . In this form, he could generate energy skulls to attack opponents.

Dopants
The  are humans who received Gaia Memories from the Museum. Originally, the Memories were created using Philip's link to the true Gaia Memory by means of the Gaia Library. After Philip was taken however, the Museum resorts to using a shrine located under the Sonozaki manor to create Gaia Memories. From there, the Museum sells them to the highest bidder or to common criminals in order to use them as guinea pigs to study the Gaia Memories as part of the Gaia Impact project. Despite the Museum being disbanded following Ryubee's death, some Gaia Memories fell into the hands of other groups.

While a human can possess multiple Living Connectors, the resulting Gaia Memory abuse will result in the user's death if their original Gaia Memory is destroyed. Moreover, a human can use Gaia Memories without Living Connectors to transform, though it will result in debilitating side effects.

In the manga sequel Fuuto PI, Gaia Memory users have the potential to reach a level of power called  through repeated use of a Gaia Memory that they show a high degree of compatibility with. Upon reaching High Dope, users gain various powers beyond the limits of their Gaia Memories, such as enhancing their Dopant forms and being able to utilize superhuman or psychic powers without transforming into a Dopant.

Sonozaki Family
The  is an aristocratic family based in Fuuto who founded the  crime syndicate. When his son Raito died and was reborn as an avatar of the true Gaia Memory, Ryubee used the Museum to produce and distribute the Gaia Memories that Raito created throughout the criminal underworld for experimentation, resulting in the Dopant crime waves.

While Ryubee's plan almost succeeds, it results in the family estate burning to the ground, marking the end of both its patriarch and the Museum. In the series finale, Wakana sacrifices herself to revive Raito while the rest of the Sonozaki family become part of the Earth to watch over him, tasking him with the family duty of protecting Fuuto and changing the world for the benefit of mankind.

Ryubee Sonozaki
 is a former archaeologist, the seemingly wise and jovial yet maniacal head of the Sonozaki Family, the "godfather" of the Museum syndicate, and curator of the Fuuto Museum who sees Fuuto as his personal kingdom. He sports a commanding presence and can adequately terrify many even without the use of his Terror Memory, which is the main reason why the police leave him alone despite having their suspicions regarding his activities. Due to his obsession with Fuuto and the Museum's machinations, Ryubee refuses to let anyone, including his family nor the deaths of Gaia Memory users, get in the way of his goals.

During his time as an archaeologist, Ryubee found fossil deposits and relics underneath the land his estate would later be built over, bought the grounds, and added the artifacts to the Fuuto Museum's collection. However, his son Raito died falling into it and was resurrected by the planet's powers. Following this, Ryubee began making preparations for his Gaia Impact to ensure humanity's continued survival by fusing them with the planet itself like Raito had been. Despite Raito being taken by the Narumi Detective Office and Kamen Riders W and Accel threatening his plans, Ryubee uses them to collect more data and improve the Gaia Impact as well as remains confident that he will find Raito again.

After recovering and sacrificing Raito to the Gaia Memory once more to fuse his daughter Wakana with the Earth, Ryubee is confronted by W and Accel, who join forces to defeat him, rescue Raito, and destroy his Terror Memory, along with most of the Sonozaki estate. Due to his mind having been broken over the years, Ryubee dances in the burning ruins of his house, ecstatic that he succeeded in initiating his Gaia Impact before subsequently dying in the blaze while recalling the good times he had with his family and holding no regrets about his life.

Saeko Sonozaki
Ryubee strictly raised Saeko to believe that their family is superior to all others and that they are destined to rule the world. This loveless upbringing caused her to grow up secretly hating her father, often taking the resulting rage out on her younger sister Wakana, and serves as fuel for her desire to take over the Museum to prove herself as its ideal successor. Saeko also has a tendency to kill her boyfriends if they do not live up to her expectations. When she spares Kirihiko due to his capabilities, she marries him and lets him live until he threatens the Museum's livelihood, having never truly loved him in the first place.

Following this, Saeko begins to visit Shinkuro Isaka to improve her Dopant form and focus on her plans for the Museum, growing to care for him in the process. When her coup against Ryubee fails and Isaka is killed, Saeko goes on the run, only to be hunted down by the Smilodon Dopant, who takes her Taboo Memory and leaves her for dead. However, Saeko is saved by Jun Kazu, who offers his support in her scheme to take control of the Museum.

Discarding her Gaia Driver, she obtains the Nasca Memory and uses an L.C.O.G. on herself to become the  so she can defeat Wakana. However, Wakana evolves into ClayDoll Xtreme and overpowers Saeko, forcing her to find other methods for acquiring power until the Nasca Memory is destroyed during another confrontation with Wakana. Following Ryubee's death and the Sonozaki manor's destruction, a disillusioned Saeko learns Wakana was taken by Foundation X and regains the Taboo Memory from Kazu, who names Saeko the new head of the Museum. No longer needing to prove herself superior to her father, Saeko fights Kazu to save Wakana, sacrificing herself in the process.

As the R Nasca Dopant, she possesses similar abilities as the original Nasca Dopant, though her strength and speed are much stronger.

Wakana Sonozaki
 is the youngest daughter and middle child of the Sonozaki family who, since her brother's death and disappearance, has been secretly raised to become the key element in Ryubee's plans. Working as a DJ at the local  radio station, she hosts the  show and gained a loyal fan base as a result. While she puts up a shy and kind persona on the show or whenever a crowd is around, her true personality is the complete opposite. Out of all of the members of the Sonozaki Family, she is the least involved with the Gaia Memory business as she was doted upon while growing up. After encountering Philip, Wakana begins to have second thoughts about being a Dopant and discards her ClayDoll Memory. However, Ryubee returns it to her and eventually brings her into the family business by using her as a guinea pig for testing the Xtreme Memory's effects on the true Gaia Memory.

After trying to run away with Philip, Ryubee takes Wakana to the Museum's true base of operations and convinces her that she is serving a greater good for the planet's sake. Wakana takes over control of the Museum and the Digal Corporation, bent on bringing Philip back to the Museum to complete the Gaia Impact and taking on aspects of Saeko's personality coupled with a ruthless and unforgiving streak. Prior to and during the Gaia Impact, she becomes a living Gaia Memory, fully integrating herself with the planet's vast knowledge and her ClayDoll Memory. However, she loses control after Philip is removed from the True Gaia Memory, causing an explosion that destroys the Sonozaki estate. Wakana is presumed dead, but she is secretly carried out by Jun Kazu, who seeks to use her for Foundation X's purposes until Shotaro Hidari rescues her and takes her to the hospital. Days later, Wakana attempts to force her way out to resume her family's goals, only to learn Philip disappeared into the True Gaia Memory to save her. After acquiring the means to invoke the Gaia Impact from Shroud, Wakana sacrifices her own existence to bring her brother back via the Xtreme Memory.

Kirihiko Sonozaki

 is one of the Museum's best Gaia Memory dealers who displays a love for Fuuto. While working for the Museum, he eventually catches Saeko's eye and they get married, with Kirihiko taking on her family's name. Now a member of the Sonozaki family, he receives the Nasca Memory, but is initially unaware of the truth of his in-laws' true motives nor of Kamen Rider W's existence until Kirihiko confronts the latter in battle. Seeing W as a rival, Kirihiko uses him to upgrade his Gaia Memory until he discovers the truth of the Gaia Memories while suffering from his Memory's near-fatal side effects. He attempts to take Saeko away from the Museum, but she kills him to prevent him from compromising her plans and takes the Nasca Memory, which she eventually uses for herself until Wakana destroys it. His sister, Yukie Sudo, would later go on to seek revenge for Kirihiko via her own Dopant powers before the former suffers from her own Gaia Memory's negative side effects.

Mick
 is Ryubee's beloved, loyal pet blue British Shorthair. After losing his Gaia Driver, Smilodon Memory, and Ryubee, Mick is brought to live at the Narumi Detective Office.

With the Smilodon Memory and a Gaia Driver, Mick can transform into the anthropomorphic Smilodon Dopant, gaining the ability to discharge electricity and move fast enough to evade Kamen Rider W, Luna Trigger's homing shots and outmaneuver Kamen Rider Accel Trial. Additionally, Mick is intelligent enough to know how to transform into his Dopant form and back at will.

Masquerade Dopants
 are Dopants used by the Sonozaki family, later Foundation X, as foot soldiers and thugs.

With the mass-produced Masquerade Memories, individuals can transform into the skeleton-esque Masquerade Dopants. However, they are significantly weaker than regular Dopants as they lack special abilities of their own, can be defeated by regular humans, and their Gaia Memories can be destroyed without a Maximum Drive.

Shinkuro Isaka
Ten years ago, he found no meaning in his life until he encountered Ryubee Sonozaki attacking a group of people as the Terror Dopant. This brought a maddening joy to the doctor as he vowed to steal the Terror Memory and experimented on himself with numerous Gaia Memories and Living Connectors before Shroud gave him a  called the Weather Memory in the hopes that he would be powerful enough to eliminate Ryubee. Using his newfound powers, Isaka committed a series of murders, which included Kamen Rider Accel's family, before becoming an ally to the Museum.

Following a failed attempt to add the Invisible Memory to his arsenal, Isaka's identity is exposed and he is forced to take refuge in the Sonozaki estate, where he convinces Saeko to act on her desire to take over the Museum so he can get the Terror Memory. Initially seeing her as a pawn for his research, he slowly comes to develop feelings for her. While attempting to absorb the Quetzalcoatlus Memory, Isaka is defeated by Kamen Rider Accel and loses his Weather Memory. Shortly afterward, Isaka's experiments catch up to him and cause him to dissolve into nothingness.

While transformed, he is armed with the whip-like  and can control various weather patterns, such as intense sunlight, heavy rain, lightning, tornadoes, and freezing snow. Additionally, due to his experiments and psychosis, he is immune to the Gaia Memories' negative side effects and most Maximum Drives in his Dopant form.

Minor Dopants
 : A Dopant with pyrokinetic powers. In the manga sequel Fuuto PI, Tetsuo Fubuki transforms into his own version of the Magma Dopant before coming into possession of one of two Crab Memories. Later, an unnamed Seiengun member transforms into a third version of the Magma Dopant while fighting Kamen Rider Accel.
 : A childhood friend of Shotaro's, Yousuke's girlfriend, and formerly one of Windscale's top designers. She hires Shotaro to find and defeat Yousuke so she can murder the latter. After Shotaro discovers the truth, Marina attempts to kill him as well, only to be defeated by Kamen Rider W and handed over to the authorities. As a child, Marina is portrayed by 
Deducing that Kaga stores the Life Coins in his body and his destruction will kill his victims, Kamen Rider W wins the Life Coins in a game of old maid before defeating Kaga in combat, which restores his victims.
 : A Dopant capable of traveling underwater, firing their fangs like bullets, and transforming into the monstrous, non-anthropomorphic . In episodes five and six, the childish head of one of the Museum's Gaia Memory manufacturing centers, is hired by Ryubee to thwart councilwoman  efforts to build a second Fuuto Tower. To facilitate his plan, Takamura gives a prototype model of his Anomalocaris Memory to his subordinate to serve as a decoy while he kidnaps Kusuhara's daughter  to lure her into a trap. Ultimately however, both Takamura and his accomplice are defeated by Kamen Rider W. In the series finale, an unnamed EXE member acquires another Anomalocaris Memory and transforms into a second version of the Anomalocaris Dopant, only to be defeated by Kamen Rider Joker. In the manga sequel Fuuto PI, an unnamed Seiengun member transforms into a third version of the Anomalocaris Dopant during his fight against Kamen Rider Accel.
 : A Dopant that possesses superhuman speed and the ability to climb walls. In episodes seven and eight, a sociopathic dōjinshi artist, uses the  website to find targets to kill as the Cockroach Dopant and write about his adventures in his self-published manga, . Despite running afoul of Kamen Rider W, Ikari manages to temporarily steal their equipment until Philip reclaims them so the Rider can defeat Ikari. In the tie-in novel Kamen Rider W: The One Who Continues After Z, a second Cockroach Dopant is transformed from a Zenon Resort employee, who is defeated by Kamen Rider Accel. In the series finale, an unnamed EXE member finds another Cockroach Memory and transforms into a third version of the Cockroach Dopant, only to be defeated by Kamen Rider Joker. In the manga sequel Fuuto PI, a jewelry store robber transforms into a fourth Cockroach Dopant, who is defeated by Kamen Rider W, while Hikaru Futami transforms into a fifth version before he comes into possession of one of two Crab Memories. Additionally, an unnamed Seiengun member transforms into a sixth version during his fight against Kamen Rider Accel, while an unnamed young man with the information Yoichi Yanogami wants transforms into a seventh version.
 : A Dopant armed with whip cream capable of hardening like cement and can transform into a  state. In the series, a Sonozaki family maid who possesses an insatiable sweet tooth and dreamed of becoming a pâtissier, only to become a food critic due to her lack of cooking skills, acquires the Sweets Memory and becomes the Sweets Dopant to kidnap the Sonozaki family's hired pâtissiers. However, she is defeated by Kamen Rider W. In the special Kamen Rider W Returns: Kamen Rider Eternal, an unnamed man acquires another Sweets Memory and transforms into a second version of the Sweets Dopant, only to be defeated by Kamen Rider W. In the manga sequel Fuuto PI, a third Sweets Dopant hides in Shadow Fuuto despite being a High Dope failure. Yukiko Sasaki is portrayed by  while the unnamed man is portrayed by Kamen Rider Ws head writer .
 : A young woman who seeks revenge on her ex-fiancé, who she discovered was a conman. Under normal circumstances, the Virus Dopant becomes the vector of a deadly plague that can infect entire cities. However, Sachi's transformation was interrupted and her consciousness was trapped in the Gaia Memory's influence, weakening the Virus Dopant but granting it the ability to infect electronics.
In the series, Wakana's weak-willed manager who loves her in spite of her abusing him, receives the Violence Memory from Wind Wave DJ  as part of Saeki's plot to force Wakana off the air. Upon being exposed, Ageo kidnaps Wakana and leads her to Saeki before he is defeated by Kamen Rider W while Kirihiko kills Saeki.
In the series, a thief and one half of the  burglar duo alongside , was hired by Saeko to lure out Philip and received the Arms Memory to complete the task. However, he becomes an uncontrollable sadist, abandoning Aso and their morals to go on a burglary spree to lure out Kamen Rider W and take him hostage. Nevertheless, Philip uses the Fang Memory to transform into Kamen Rider W, Fang Joker and defeat Kurata, who is left for the police. In the manga sequel Fuuto PI, an unnamed ORIGIN member transforms into a second version of the Arms Dopant, who is defeated by Kamen Rider Accel.
 : A Dopant capable of flying and firing feather darts. In the series, a junior high school girl, was selected by Saeko to test the limits of the Bird Memory, which the Museum developed to allow those without Living Connectors to transform into the Bird Dopant. They are defeated by Kamen Rider W and taken to the hospital due to the Memory's addictive side effects while Akane suffers from withdrawal and reacquires the Bird Memory, which she uses to evolve into the Bird Dopant's . She is later defeated by Kamen Rider W and Kirihiko.
 : The son of flower coordinator, who received bad press due to her son's actions. Makiko attempts to take the blame for Kiyoshi's actions, but Kamen Rider W deduces the truth before Kamen Rider Accel defeats and arrests Kiyoshi.
The first user, is a former Fuuto PD officer who transferred to the LAPD following encouragement from her partner , whom she loved. After crooked cops  and  kill Mizoguchi, Aya returns to Fuuto and purchases the Triceratops Memory to take revenge against them. Despite succeeding in killing Himuro and Akutsu, the Gaia Memory's corrupting influence causes Aya to shift the target of her revenge to Fuuto itself before she is defeated by Kamen Rider Accel. In the manga sequel Fuuto PI, a second Triceratops Dopant hides in Shadow Fuuto despite being a High Dope failure.
While Sawada betrays her after she fails to pay him the amount he wants and exposes Jimmy as a bad musician, Sawada is later exposed and defeated by Kamen Riders W and Accel.
 : A children's author who gained commercial success for his book , which he wrote to reflect his feelings for his daughter , who died one month prior. Using his powers, he seeks revenge on critics who harshly reviewed his book and those who claim he did not truly love his daughter.
 : A college student at Fuuto University who fell in love with  when she called him her "prince". After realizing that she tells this to any male who assists her however, he becomes plagued by the thought of her never reciprocating his love and suffers from insomnia as a result. While he fakes being one of the Nightmare Dopant's victims to throw Kamen Rider W off his trail, Akiko uses her habit of talking in her sleep to expose Fukushima before W defeats him.
 : A Dopant that possesses superhuman strength and regenerative properties. While Sokichi Narumi investigated, the case went cold until Isamu Bito took the fall. In the present, a wealthy Maruo and Suzuko attempt to finish their heist after recovering the Zone Memory, only to be defeated by Kamen Rider W. In the manga sequel Fuuto PI, a second Beast Dopant hides in Shadow Fuuto despite being a High Dope failure. They later attack Tokime, only to be killed by Hideo Chiba.
 : Maruo's wife referred to as  who possesses the Zone Memory and can transform into the non-anthropomorphic pyramid-like . While transformed, she has the ability to teleport anything she sees within a given area to a different spot. A decade prior, she assisted her husband in his crime wave until she lost the Zone Memory, which Sokichi found and hid in a bear statue. After Shotaro finds the Zone Memory and confronts Suzuko with it in the present, she steals it back and turns into the Zone Dopant to assist her husband in fighting Kamen Rider W, only to be defeated by the latter.
 : The younger sister of Kirihiko who comes to Fuuto to take revenge against Saeko for her brother's death and join the Museum. Being immune to her Gaia Memory's corrupting influence, Yukie is able to choreograph her attacks to suit her needs. She manipulates Kamen Rider W's actions to make him kill Saeko the next day, but Kamen Rider Accel rescues Saeko at the last minute. After being exposed as the Yesterday Dopant, Yukie attempts to kill Saeko herself, but Isaka's modifications to Saeko's Taboo Memory reflects Yukie's attacks back to her. Kamen Rider W destroys Yukie's Gaia Memory, but its side effects manifest and give her amnesia.
 : A formerly normal woman who was kidnapped by the Museum so neuroscientist  can rewrite her mind and make her one of the organization's top assassins. Ryubee tasks the Grasshopper Woman with killing Yamashiro after he attempts to leave the Museum. She mortally wounds Yamashiro before Kamen Rider Accel destroys her Gaia Memory and Mick kills her to prevent her from leaking information about the Museum.
While transformed, he can use his right arm-mounted  to alter the genetic makeup of anything he touches. Using his powers, he creates a seven-hour incomplete film and tricks theater-goers into watching it. After being defeated by Kamen Rider W, Akiko decides to rehabilitate Kawai by taking over his film's production and help him get together with the star, . After Wakana uses his powers to fuse the Gaia Progressor with her body and Akiko beats some sense into him, Kawai stands up for himself, allows W to destroy the Gene Memory, and begins working on his film his way alongside Ai.
 : A popular male model with a perverse sense of love. While transformed, Uesugi possesses photokinesis, an invulnerable body capable of withstanding most Maximum Drives, and the ability to turn people into diamonds. After turning Satoru into a diamond, Uesugi forces Rui to become his unwilling accomplice and scapegoat while he turns other women into diamonds. However, Rui frames Detective Jinno, which causes a chain of events that eventually exposes Uesugi and thwarts his plans before Kamen Rider W pinpoints his Dopant form's weak spot and defeats him, restoring Uesugi's victims in the process.
 : A palm reader who Shroud gave the Old Memory to as part of a plan to eliminate Shotaro. Additionally, Soma can rotate his Dopant form and assume a faster, combat-oriented form. Despite Shroud's claim that only Kamen Rider W Cyclone Accel Xtreme can defeat the Old Dopant, Kamen Riders Accel and W work together to defeat Soma.

Other Dopants
: A Dopant who wields a scythe and possesses tongue-like tentacles capable of neutralizing Gaia Memories and the ability to allow the user to separate from its tattered body. After Kamen Rider Skull defeated the first version sometime prior to the series, Roberto Shijima uses the Death Dopant's likeness and perceived ability to resurrect dead individuals as part of his plot to scare people to death during the events of the crossover film Kamen Rider × Kamen Rider W & Decade: Movie War 2010, only to be exposed by Kamen Rider W. During the events of the manga sequel Fuuto PI, Street assassin  becomes the new Death Dopant before he is killed by the Joker Dopant.
 : The master of the OmuriFu omelette rice shop, which is owned by his daughter , who appears exclusively in the DVD special Kamen Rider W Hyper Battle DVD: Donburi's α/Farewell Beloved Recipe. Aida initially overpowers Kamen Riders W and Accel after they intervene, but Philip deduces the Oyakodon Dopant's true nature so Kamen Rider W can defeat him. Following this, Master decides not to press charges and has Aida work for him to pay off the damage and help Aida start anew instead.
 : A stronger version of the Nasca Dopant derived from the T2 Nasca Memory forcibly transforming an unnamed individual. They are defeated by Kamen Rider Accel and appear exclusively in the film Kamen Rider W Forever A to Z The Gaia Memories of Fate.
 : A stronger version of the Weather Dopant derived from the T2 Weather Memory forcibly transforming an unnamed individual. They are defeated by Kamen Rider Accel and appear exclusively in the film Kamen Rider W Forever A to Z The Gaia Memories of Fate.
 : A Dopant derived from the Ammonite Memory. A Gaia Memory test subject died as a result of using a prototype model of the Ammonite Memory. The Ammonite Dopant appears exclusively in the tie-in novel The Beginning of N/Blood and Dreams.
 : A Dopant derived from the Trilobite Memory. A Gaia Memory test subject died as a result of using a prototype model of the Trilobite Memory. The Trilobite Dopant appears exclusively in the tie-in novel The Beginning of N/Blood and Dreams.
 : A Dopant derived from the Mammoth Memory. A Gaia Memory test subject died as a result of using a prototype model of the Mammoth Memory. The Mammoth Dopant appears exclusively in the tie-in novel The Beginning of N/Blood and Dreams.
 : A Dopant capable of controlling machines with its ultrasonic voice. In the film Kamen Rider × Kamen Rider OOO & W Featuring Skull: Movie War Core, Museum Gaia Memory dealer  operated as the first Bat Dopant in 1999. While assisting the Spider Dopant in his plot to kidnap Melissa, Komori was defeated by Kamen Rider Skull and left to die underneath an exploding tanker truck.
Yoshie Onodera appears exclusively in the tie-in novel Kamen Rider W: Playback.
 : The owners and operators of the conglomerate  in Fuuto. One of Fuuto's wealthiest families, the Zenkujis fight amongst themselves over their family inheritance following the death of their patriarch, . Eventually, as Philip and Terui become involved in the investigation, members of the Zenkuji family turn their attention towards killing the illegitimate daughter  until they are all defeated by Kamen Rider W. The Zenkuji family and their workers appear exclusively in the tie-in novel Kamen Rider W: The One Who Continues After Z.
 : A Dopant with the ability to use various animal abilities. The wolf-like Zoo Memory was originally purchased by the eldest brother  with the intent of killing his half-sister, Kasumi, and obtaining land to establish his own Gaia Memory factory. However, Kasumi's birth mother and the Zenkujis' head maid, steals the Memory and transforms into the Zoo Dopant to protect her daughter before Toshihide recovers it while Azusa is fighting Kamen Rider W.
While transformed, she becomes proficient in aerial combat, wields a stinger-like needle capable of secreting poison, and can transform Bee Dopants into suicide bombers.
While transformed, she is armed with a whip, though her face becomes more vulnerable.
 Zenon Resort employees: The Zenkujis' employees, several of whom the family transform into animal-themed Dopants as part of their reinforcements.
 : Three mass-produced versions of the Queen Bee Dopant with the ability to self-destruct on her orders. One of the Bee Dopants self-destruct while the remaining two are defeated by Kamen Rider W.
 : A Dopant with increased jumping and fighting capabilities and claws. They are defeated by Kamen Rider W.
 : A Dopant that excels in underwater combat, though their dorsal fin becomes a vulnerability. They are easily defeated by Kamen Rider Accel.
 : A Dopant with a thick hide and a long trunk. They are defeated by Kamen Rider W.
 : A Dopant with a regenerative healing factor. They are defeated by Kamen Rider Accel after Kamen Rider W disables its regenerative organ.
 : A Dopant with sharp teeth. They are defeated by Kamen Rider W alongside the Queen Bee Dopant.
 : A Dopant capable of nullifying a target's energy upon physical contact and is armed with a chain. A Museum assassin, who Toshihide Zenkuji hired to recover his Zoo Memory, is tasked with obtaining cells from W, Cyclone Joker Xtreme's Crystal Server. He accomplishes the task during the Zenkujis' fight against Kamen Riders W and Accel, but the latter defeats Zero and Mick kills him to prevent him from leaking information about the Museum before stealing W's cells for the Gaia Progressor. The Museum assassin appears exclusively in the tie-in novel Kamen Rider W: The One Who Continues After Z.
He is defeated by Kamen Rider W. Yuichi Zaizen appears exclusively in the tie-in novel Kamen Rider W: The One Who Continues After Z.
After losing his money and Gaia Memory to Tokime, whom he took pity on, he comes to the Narumi Detective Office for help in retrieving his possessions for fear of the Fuuto PD discovering his use of a Gaia Memory. Upon learning her name, Tsubosaki falls in love with and vows to reform Tokime despite her becoming a murder suspect. He eventually finds her again, but Shotaro discovers the truth and attempts to convince Tsubosaki to give up his Gaia Memory. Tsubosaki refuses and is later arrested by Ryu Terui.
While transformed, he can fly and fire needle-like projectiles from the tail extending from the back of his head which double as melee weapons. His Dopant form later acquires the ability to generate wing vibrations capable of slowing down the movement of surrounding people and produce a swarm of giant dragonfly larvae from its right arm. He seeks to kill cosplay idol , who won a video game match against him and made him lose face in front of an audience. Mihara is defeated by Kamen Rider W before he is killed by the Aurora Dopant.
While transformed, she possesses sharp, extendible claws. Due to her defective, irremovable Gaia Memory, she is forced to hide in Fuuto's sewer tunnels until Kamen Rider W destroys her Gaia Memory. Mayu Chono appears exclusively in the manga sequel Fuuto PI.
 : A Dopant derived from a Silver Memory called the Alcohol Memory that possesses the ability to make the Memory user feel no pain, shoot alcohol from its left arm, and fire a heat ray from its eye.  is a friend of Ryubee Sonozaki's and primary user of the Alcohol Memory, having achieved High Dope and telekinesis. Kiku selects office worker , maiko , former gravure idol , and hostess  as candidates to potentially succeed her as the Alcohol Dopant and become the fiancé of her grandson , head of the Kagamino family. Kubokura escapes death, but Zaizen and Arito die of alcohol poisoning. Kiku is defeated by Kamen Rider W before setting fire to the Kagamino estate to die in the blaze.
While transformed, he possesses four arms and can separate his body into multiple parts, transform his tetromino-shaped head parts into various weapons, and seal people's arms in his cube-shaped head parts to use them as his arms. His High Dope ability allows him to know everything about people's physical abilities via physical contact. He is defeated by Kamen Rider W. Paul Tojo appears exclusively in the manga sequel Fuuto PI.
 : A Dopant derived from the Antlion Memory capable of draining humans of their moisture via its pincers, fire needle-like projectiles, and geokinesis that Kamen Rider Skull defeated in a flashback. The Antlion Dopant appears exclusively in the manga sequel Fuuto PI.
 : A unique Dopant derived from two people using two Owl Memories that possesses superhuman strength, flight, aerokinetic powers, sharp talons, and the ability to separate its head and body, both of which can operate independently of each other. His High Dope ability allows him to visually identify people's most compatible Gaia Memories. He brainwashes his cram school's student, to transform her into the Owl Dopant's body via another Owl Memory. Toba and Mai are defeated by Kamen Riders W and Accel respectively. Otokichi Toba and Mai Okita appear exclusively in the manga sequel Fuuto PI.
While transformed, he possesses acidic sludge that covers the right side of his body capable of allowing objects to pass through safely and withstanding most forms of attack, acidic sludge cannons on his left arm, and the ability to eat inedible matter. His High Dope ability allows him to heal himself as well as his Dopant form by eating trash, which allowed him to recover from partial paralysis. He is defeated by Kamen Rider W before sacrificing himself to save the latter from the Aurora Dopant. Billy Butsuda appears exclusively in the manga sequel Fuuto PI.
 : A Dopant derived from the Crab Memory that possesses four crab leg-like arms on its back, the ability to fire crab claw-shaped energy slashes from its head, and an accelerated healing factor. , the violent leader of the Katsumi Daido worship gang , and his pawn, Hikaru Futami, both transform into Crab Dopants, but are defeated simultaneously by Kamen Rider W before Tetsuo is murdered by Hikaru as the Reactor Dopant. Tetsuo Fubuki appears exclusively in the manga sequel Fuuto PI.
While transformed, he can transform part of his skin into anything he wants. His High Dope ability allows him to absorb people's intelligence. He is defeated by Kamen Rider W. Luke Lancaster appears exclusively in the manga sequel Fuuto PI.
While transformed, he possesses two tentacles on his head, which double as cutting weapons, and can swim through land and walls as if they were water. Before joining Street, he was a sidetracked employee of Chi Operations until Yukiji Bando sensed his inner darkness and promoted him to CEO's secretary. While the Deep Memory's side effects cured Demon's severe illness, it unleashed his inner darkness. He is defeated by Kamen Rider W before being consumed by a horde of Road Dopants. Daiki Demon appears exclusively in the manga sequel Fuuto PI.
While transformed, she possesses four arms that can cut through anything remotely and turn into an alternate form capable of cutting through space. She is defeated by Kamen Rider W. Hiromi Hashiba appears exclusively in the manga sequel Fuuto PI.
While transformed, he possesses a pair of extra arms, can generate a singing voice capable of hypnotizing and controlling anyone he wishes, and fire compressed ultra-high frequency soundwaves as explosive musical note-shaped bullets from his mouth. He is defeated by Kamen Rider W. Shuichiro Gendo appears exclusively in the manga sequel Fuuto PI.

Fuuto PD
The  serves as an additional force working to fight the Dopant crime wave, occasionally working with the Narumi Detective Office and Kamen Rider W in pursuit of this goal.

Mikio Jinno
 is a gullible senior detective of Fuuto PD. Despite his personality, he is a dedicated and sometimes wise officer. He is also a friend of Shotaro Hidari's, with whom he discusses cases despite being unaware of Shotaro's connection to Kamen Rider W.

Shun Makura
 is Jinno's unpleasant rookie partner who is doubtful of Shotaro's skills and sees his involvement with police investigations as unnecessary. As such, Makura and Shotaro often get into fights when they are together, forcing Jinno to break them up. Makura is also impulsive, often jumping to conclusions when it comes to solving crimes and accusing people of committing crimes with little to no proof except from the word of a superior officer.

Fuuto Irregulars
The  are denizens of Fuuto and informants that Shotaro goes to for information and assistance.

Watcherman
 is the username of an otaku blogger who is Shotaro's informant on internet-based Dopant activities. During the events of the film Kamen Rider W Forever A to Z The Gaia Memories of Fate, Watcherman obtains the T2 Violence Memory, which forcibly transforms him into the  until he is saved by Kamen Rider W and taken to a free clinic.

Santa
 is a mysterious man dressed as Santa Claus year-round except on Christmas, during which he dresses in a reindeer outfit, who promotes local companies by giving out freebies, or presents, which always seem to help out the recipient. During the events of the film W Forever A to Z The Gaia Memories of Fate, Santa obtains the T2 IceAge Memory, which forcibly transforms him into the  until he is saved by Kamen Rider W and taken to a free clinic. A year after W defeats Jun Kazu, Santa becomes the owner of a pet shop.

Queen & Elizabeth

Isamu Bito
Ten years ago, Bito took the heat for an armored car robbery involving the Beastman, who was Maruo Arima and Suzuko Arima, his employee and a woman he had feelings for respectively. After the case is solved, Bito continues with his job.

Akira Aoyama
As of the manga sequel Fuuto PI, Akira has become a junior high schooler and the newest member of the Fuuto Irregulars.

Shroud
A decade prior to the series, she sought to take her son Raito away from her husband Ryubee after the former became an avatar of the True Gaia Memory. However, she was horrifically scarred by Ryubee and left her family to seek revenge, covering her face in an extensive amount of bandages to obscure her disfigurement and taking on the identity of "Shroud".

Over the course of the intervening years, she gave Shinkuro Isaka the Weather Memory in the hopes he could defeat Ryubee. After he goes on a killing spree however, she turned to developing Kamen Riders Skull, W, and Accel's refined Gaia Memories, Rider equipment, and the T2 Gaia Memories. After Sokichi's death, Shroud became Accel's benefactor after seeing a kindred spirit in him and conditions him to become Shotaro Hidari's replacement as Raito's partner and transform them into Kamen Rider W Cyclone Accel Extreme.

Due to her dealings with Isaka being revealed however, Shroud forgoes her revenge and allows the Riders to fight their way before returning to the Sonozaki estate during Ryubee's Gaia Impact to visit Raito and tell him Shotaro is the only family he has left, which inspires him to thwart Ryubee's plans. Sometime between W's final fight with Jun Kazu and the series finale, Shroud spoke with her daughter Wakana Sonozaki before she quietly passed away by her side and became one with the Earth alongside the rest of her fallen family members.

Through unknown means, Shroud possesses supernatural powers such as pyrokinesis, the conjuring of random objects, and disappearing into thin air. Additionally, she possesses a  firearm and the refined  Memory.

Foundation X
 is a mysterious research foundation that provides funding to the Museum. Following Ryubee Sonozaki's death and the Museum's dissolution, Foundation X takes over their Gaia Impact project until Jun Kazu is killed, after which they re-focus their efforts on studying other prospective projects such as the Kamen Rider OOO's O Medals, Mitsuaki Gamou's Cosmic Energy, the Genm Corporation's Gashats, and Kamen Rider Build's Fullbottles.

Jun Kazu
 is a psychic Foundation X researcher who allows himself to be modified by the research of those he represents. He comes off as cold and emotionless, speaking in a flat monotone voice and dropping whatever he is holding whenever he sees someone else display emotions. However, when sufficiently angered, he will release his emotions in a torrential manner. Becoming the Museum's sponsor and overseeing their investments, Kazu eventually obtains Dopant powers of his own.

During the events of the V-Cinema prequel special Kamen Rider Eternal, Kazu served as Doctor Prospect's liaison to Foundation X and acquired his psychic powers. He also utilized the Eternal Memory and a Lost Driver to transform into Kamen Rider Eternal  until Katsumi Daido unknowingly exploits Kazu's incompatibility with the Eternal Memory to depower him. Daido later kills Kazu, who Foundation X recovers and turns into a Necro-Over.

Following his conversion, Kazu arrives in Fuuto to save the rogue Saeko Sonozaki and offer Foundation X's support in her plot to overthrow Ryubee out of love for her. After Kamen Riders W and Accel dismantle the Museum, Kazu rescues Wakana Sonozaki and digitizes her into a Foundation X satellite in an attempt to use her to kill all life on Earth that are not compatible with Gaia Memories and cleanse the human race's impurities. Due to Wakana's comatose state, Kazu is forced to reveal himself to the Kamen Riders and bide his time until her power returns. Upon discovering Philip is tied to Wakana's emotions, Kazu attacks everyone close to him to initiate his own Gaia Impact. When Saeko attempts to rescue Wakana, Kazu professes his love for her, but she rebuffs him. While he reluctantly kills Saeko, Shotaro Hidari rescues Wakana. Kazu attacks and battles Kamen Rider W, but they overload him with Philip's emotions before defeating him, causing Kazu to dissolve into nothingness.

With a Gaia Driver and a Gold Memory called the Utopia Memory, the latter of which is capable of granting the user's wishes, Kazu can transform into the seemingly omnipotent . While transformed, he gains reality-bending powers, the ability to repel attacks directed at him, and absorb living beings' emotions to further power the Utopia Memory. Additionally, Kazu can utilize his psychic powers to augment his Dopant powers.

Tabata
 is a Foundation X researcher assigned to transport a suitcase containing the T2 Gaia Memories to Foundation X's headquarters during the series, only to be attacked by Katsumi Daido during the events of the film Kamen Rider W Forever: A to Z/The Gaia Memories of Fate. While Daido claims the T2 Eternal Memory, Tabata activates the suitcase's self-destruct, killing himself and dispersing the remaining T2 Memories throughout Fuuto.

Neon Ulsland
 is the strict and punctual female leader of Foundation X who researches unusual events or artifacts and uses the educational grading system to determine their importance to her organization. She also carries a stopwatch and allocates a specific amount of time towards her actions, even going so far as to interrupt others should it affect her schedule. After Jun Kazu's second death, she officially ends Foundation X's Gaia Memory research.

Guest characters
As part of his plans to add more Gaia Memory powers to his Dopant form, Shinkuro Isaka modifies the Invisible Memory and gives it to Lily to test, knowing it will eventually kill her and allow him to take the Memory back later. She initially goes to the Narumi Detective Office for help in controlling her abilities, but returns to Isaka, who claims he can stabilize the Invisible Memory. Ultimately, Kamen Rider Accel uses his Engine Blade to temporarily stop Lily's heart so he can remove and destroy the Invisible Memory. As of the V-Cinema sequel special, Kamen Rider Accel, Lily has become a waitress at Frank's coffee shop.
 : A worker at the Fuuto Bird Sanctuary who became the unwilling subject of Shinkuro Isaka's experiments with her Gold Quetzalcoatlus Memory and corresponding non-anthropomorphic  form's powers after he killed her father. After discovering her fear of him strengthened her connection to the Gaia Memory, Isaka creates a copy of it and uses it to transform a red-and-green macaw into a giant version of the Quetzalcoatlus Dopant to frighten Nagi further, with the intention of having the copy Dopant fuse with her so he can add the Quetzalcoatlus Dopant's powers to his own Dopant form. However, Kamen Rider W rescues Nagi and the macaw while Kamen Rider Accel destroys the Quetzalcoatlus Memory.
 : A co-leader of EXE who possesses the  Memory. He attempts to acquire the Ocean Memory, but is defeated by Kamen Rider Joker.

Spin-off exclusive characters

Roberto Shijima
Father  is a Catholic priest and a major figure within the  cult who appears exclusively in the film Kamen Rider × Kamen Rider W & Decade: Movie War 2010. Using the Dummy Memory, he assumes the likenesses of the Death Dopant and upper-class individuals' recently deceased relatives to scare them to death. When Kamen Rider W interferes, Shijima assumes Sokichi Narumi's likeness to throw them off, but W eventually exposes Shijima. The latter escapes, only to end up in another universe due to Kamen Rider Decade's battle with Super Shocker and absorbed by the Neo Organism, who uses Shijima to transform into the inhuman Ultimate D.

While transformed, he gains shapeshifting abilities.

Master
 is the owner of  ramen who specializes in making ramen with large narutomaki and appears exclusively in the special Kamen Rider W Hyper Battle DVD: Donburi's α/Farewell Beloved Recipe, the film Kamen Rider W Forever A to Z The Gaia Memories of Fate, and the latter's tie-in web series Kamen Rider W Forever: From A to Z, 26 Rapid-Succession Roars of Laughter.

"Master" is portrayed by the series' assistant line producer .

NEVER
The  is group composed of humans who have been revived and turned into undead supersoldiers called  (NEVERs) who appear exclusively in the film Kamen Rider W Forever A to Z The Gaia Memories of Fate and the V-Cinema prequel special Kamen Rider W Returns: Kamen Rider Eternal. Though much stronger, faster, and more durable than normal humans, Necro-Overs' ability to feel emotions diminishes over time and require bio-stabilizer injections to keep their bodies intact. After Foundation X abandons them to conduct research into the Museum's Gaia Memories, the NEVERs became mercenaries in an attempt to prove their superiority over the Museum.

Following an encounter with Foundation X's Doctor Prospect and their leader going mad however, NEVER seeks to destroy the Museum by acquiring Foundation X's  to power the  device and convert Fuuto's residents into NEVERs like them. However, their exceptional compatibility with the T2 Gaia Memories make the NEVERs more susceptible to Kamen Riders W and Accel's Maximum Drives and Kamen Rider OOO's Scanning Charges, which cause them to turn to dust.

Katsumi Daido
 is the leader of NEVER. As revealed in the short story "The Beginning of N/Blood and Dream" and the prequel special Kamen Rider W Returns: Kamen Rider Eternal, Katsumi was a resident of Fuuto born with a congenital heart defect. After being involved in a near-fatal car crash, his mother Maria Daido used her research to revive her son as a Necro-Over. Using bio-stimulants to ensure he ages properly, he proves to be a superior fighter, but he and Maria are forced to go rogue after Foundation X shuts down her project. Soon after, Katsumi recruits four people who recently died into his newly formed mercenary group NEVER, converting them into Necro-Overs in the process.

During one of their missions, Daido meets and falls in love with Mina before acquiring the experimental Eternal Memory, which can neutralize nearby Gaia Memories, and the means to become . However, after Mina's apparent death and losing the Memory to Doctor Prospect, Daido goes mad and attempts to destroy the Museum and Fuuto.

During the events of the film Kamen Rider W Forever: A to Z/The Gaia Memories of Fate, Daido acquires the  Memory, which can negate non-T2 Gaia Memories, to regain his Rider powers before leading NEVER in acquiring the other 25 T2 Gaia Memories from Foundation X to facilitate their plans. However, Maria and Kamen Rider W thwart his plans and kill him permanently.

Utilizing the Lost Driver in conjunction with the Eternal Memory, Daido can transform into Kamen Rider Eternal . While transformed, he wields the  dagger. Moreover, he can perform the  Maximum Drive on his own and the  Maximum Drive via the Eternal Edge. Additionally, he can use the  Memory to augment his attacks with energy drills, the  Memory to summon the other T2 Gaia Memories to him, and all 26 T2 Gaia Memories to transform into his  form and perform the  Maximum Drive.

As a teenager, he is portrayed by Masaki Suda, who also portrays Philip.

Kyosui Izumi
 is a flamboyant gay man with sadomasochist quirks who was originally a Yakuza subordinate before he was betrayed and fatally stabbed. He fell in love with Katsumi Daido within seconds of the former's death and became his right-hand man after becoming a Necro-Over, expressing jealousy towards anyone who gets too close to Katsumi. While assisting him in his plot to destroy Fuuto, Izumi is killed permanently by Kamen Rider OOO.

In combat, Izumi wields a whip and is an expert grappler capable of wrapping himself around people's bodies and snapping them like twigs.

Reika Hanehara
 is a former serial criminal who was killed while attempting to escape Alcatraz to avoid the death penalty and became the newest member of NEVER. Initially hating how cold her undead body is, she slowly comes to grips with her new existence while helping Katsumi Daido free Doctor Prospect's Quark prisoners. Despite being horrified by Katsumi's transformation into an unfeeling monster following Mina's apparent death, Hanehara believes he still has some good left in him and follows him to Fuuto to enact his plot to destroy the city. After being defeated by Kamen Rider Joker, she returns to Daido's side to beg for his help, only to be rebuffed and permanently die in Joker's arms.

Gozo Domoto
 is a muscular yet somewhat dimwitted young man who is proficient in stick-fighting and died protecting a piece of land from developers becoming a Necro-Over. Despite acquiring T2 Dopant powers while aiding Katsumi Daido in his plot to destroy Fuuto, Domoto is willing to fight Kamen Rider W without them. He is eventually killed permanently by Kamen Rider Joker.

Ken Ashihara
 is a young firearms expert and marksman who was killed in a gunfight and left behind a family. While aiding Katsumi Daido in his plot to destroy Fuuto, Ashihara fights Kamen Rider Accel on several occasions before the latter permanently kills him.

Maria Daido
When her son Katsumi Daido was nearly killed in a car accident, she used her research to revive him as a Necro-Over, but was forced to leave Foundation X after they abandoned her in favor of researching the Museum's Gaia Memories.

Following this, Maria supported Katsumi in his mercenary activities before eventually returning to Fuuto with him. After obtaining T2 Dopant powers and discovering Raito, Maria goes undercover as Interpol agent  so she could manipulate and kidnap him for Katsumi's plan to destroy Fuuto. At the last minute however, she gets second thoughts and tries to stop Katsumi, only to be killed by him.

Seiichiro Matsui
Despite working with him, Matsu secretly harbored jealousy towards Sokichi for always "getting the girl". After being hired by Melissa to protect her from Kozo Yaguchi, a chain of events resulted in Matsu getting ahold of the Spider Memory and becoming one of the first Gaia Memory users while in pursuit of his goal. As his mind became warped by the memory, Matsu's feelings for Melissa became amplified to the point where he wanted her all to himself. Sokichi eventually deduced Matsu's identity and killed him while destroying his Gaia Memory despite still seeing him as his partner.

While transformed, he can produce  threads for multiple purposes and implant small  into humans, which spin silk around a person's closest loved one and explode upon contact with them.

Melissa
 is a famous opera singer who came to Fuuto in 1999 and appears exclusively in the film Kamen Rider × Kamen Rider OOO & W Featuring Skull: Movie War Core. After meeting Sokichi Narumi and due to an encounter with the Spider Dopant, she agreed to take the former's place at his daughter Akiko Narumi's wedding in the present.

Melissa is portrayed by Hikaru Yamamoto, who also portrays Akiko Narumi.

Kozo Yaguchi
 is Melissa's manager and head of the Yaguchi Talent Agency who appears exclusively in the film Kamen Rider × Kamen Rider OOO & W Featuring Skull: Movie War Core. Because of his seedy nature, Sokichi considered Yaguchi a suspect for the Spider Dopant's identity, only to learn Yaguchi was actually using his agency to supply the Museum with guinea pigs before Yaguchi was killed by a Spider Bomb that the Spider Dopant implanted in the former's wife.

Stone
 is an unassuming architecture otaku skilled in lock picking who appears exclusively in the film Kamen Rider × Kamen Rider OOO & W Featuring Skull: Movie War Core. After Isamu Bito introduced Stone to Sokichi Narumi to help him solve the "Spider Man" case, Stone helped Sokichi break into the Yaguchi Talent Agency, but the former was captured and murdered by the Bat Dopant.

Kamen Rider Core
 is a giant magma-based monster created from three black Core Medals and the  who appears exclusively in the film Kamen Rider × Kamen Rider OOO & W Featuring Skull: Movie War Core. He attempts to destroy the world, but is foiled and destroyed by Kamen Riders W and OOO, who shatter the Medals and Memory in the process.

In battle, Core is powered by Earth's inner core, can burn anything within physical contact, possesses pyrokinesis, and can turn the lower half of his body into a motorcycle.

Aoi Katsuragi
 is a member of a pick-pocketing ring and the daughter of a thief who appears exclusively in the V-Cinema sequel special Kamen Rider W Returns: Kamen Rider Accel. Sometime prior to the special, she witnessed Hiroshi Sagami of the Fuuto PD murder her father, but initially could not recall his face. As a result, Katsuragi came to distrust police officers. In the present, she comes into possession of the Gaia Memory Enhancing Adapter and comes into Kamen Rider Accel's protective custody after Sagami targets her for the adapter. Following Sagami's arrest, Katsuragi turns herself in as part of an effort to better herself and start over.

Hiroshi Sagami
 is a corrupt police officer within the Fuuto PD who appears exclusively in the V-Cinema sequel Kamen Rider W Returns: Kamen Rider Accel. Three years prior to the special, he lost his wife to a criminal he had arrested sometime prior. Furious with the law's inability to reform criminals, he obtained the Commander Memory and began executing any criminals he came across regardless of the severity of their crimes. Seeing Ryu Terui as a kindred spirit, Sagami kidnaps the former's wife, Akiko Narumi, to force him to give into his vengeful feelings once more and become Sagami's successor. Refusing to go down this path again, Terui saves Akiko and defeats Sagami, who is taken into custody.

While transformed, he can create  to fight for him and possesses a gauntlet capable of materializing and destroying matter. After obtaining the Gaia Memory Enhancing Adapter, Sagami upgrades his Dopant form and gains the ability to fire a barrage of missiles.

Mina
 is a young woman and one of Doctor Prospect's Quarks who possesses psychokinesis, pyrokinesis, and psychometry and appears exclusively in the V-Cinema sequel special Kamen Rider W Returns: Kamen Rider Eternal. After NEVER stumbled onto Prospect's work, Mina betrayed him and joined forces with the mercenaries in the hopes of rescuing her fellow Quarks. However, Prospect used his Dopant powers to kill the Quarks. While Mina survived, her apparent death led to NEVER's leader Katsumi Daido going mad and attempting to destroy Fuuto. Believing Daido was still a hero, Mina eventually comes to Fuuto herself to avenge him by killing Kamen Rider W, only to learn of what Katsumi did and tell W what he did for her in turn.

Doctor Prospect
 is a Foundation X scientist who studied the use of psychics, created an army of psychic supersoldiers called , and appears exclusively in the V-Cinema prequel special Kamen Rider W Returns: Kamen Rider Eternal. To keep the Quarks in line and weed out weaker Quarks, he utilized Dopant powers and a barrier known as the  respectively. After NEVER threatened his plans, Prospect killed most of the Quarks, but NEVER's leader Katsumi Daido destroyed the former's Gaia Memory and killed Prospect with his own Dopant powers.

While transformed, he could detect an opponent's next move and counter accordingly and brand victims with eye markings that will kill them should they disobey him.

Lloyd and Shion

Professor Zeus
 is a Foundation X scientist who experiments with Core Energy and appears exclusively in the video game Kamen Rider: Memory of Heroez. In an attempt to revive his colleague Professor Aida, the only person he felt understood him before she died in a freak accident, he became a Dopant and continued work on her eternal supersoldier project. After being defeated by Kamen Riders W, OOO, and Zero-One, Zeus discovers Aida converted her mind into an A.I. and manipulated him and the Riders into helping her assume control of an artificial Greeed called Muchiri and achieve immortality. Zeus later joins forces with a revived Ankh and Kirihiko Sonozaki in sacrificing themselves to foil Aida's plans.

While transformed, he possesses electrokinesis and can transform further into a  form.

Aida
 is a Foundation X scientist who established the eternal supersoldier project and appears exclusively in the video game Kamen Rider: Memory of Heroez. While she was presumed dead following a freak accident, in reality, she had converted her mind into an A.I. and transferred it into a floating robot body called , but lost most of her memories in the process. She manipulates her colleague Professor Zeus and Kamen Riders W, OOO, and Zero-One into helping her regain her memories and take control of the artificial Greeed, Muchiri, so she can achieve immortality. However, she is destroyed by W, OOO, and Zero-One while Zeus sacrifices himself to foil her plans.

Street
 is a Dopant crime syndicate that seeks to continue the Museum's work with Gaia Memories as well as pursue a "greater achievement". Similarly to the Sonozaki family, Street's high-ranking members utilize the  belt in conjunction with a Gaia Memory to transform. Additionally, they can add a secondary Gaia Memory to temporarily augment their Dopant forms. Street appears exclusively in the manga sequel Fuuto PI and its subsequent anime adaptation.

Yukiji Bando
 is the leader of Street who was formerly the CEO of the human resource development corporation , one of Foundation X's parent organizations.

While transformed, he can fire a powerful energy beam from his hand.

Kazuha Gojo
 is an insane executive member of Street, Tokime's replacement, and a former student of Otokichi Toba's cram school, through which she met Bando. She is defeated by Kamen Rider Accel and killed by the Death Dopant.

While transformed, she can hide within shadows and produce a powerful, high-frequency shriek capable of ripping anything in its path apart. After achieving High Dope, she gained superhuman hearing.

Hideo Chiba
, real name , is the oldest executive member of Street who does not physically age and resembles a child despite having lived for more than 70 years due to his father , a genius biologist and professor at Higashi Fuuto University who received funding from Foundation X's predecessor for his immortality research and used his son as a test subject, which led to his wife  divorcing him after Hideo was born. Though much older than the other leading members, Hideo hates being treated as an adult.

With the Brachiosaurus Memory and a Gaia Driver Rex, Hideo can transform into the giant . While transformed, he can fire sharp bones from his back and produce Masquerade Dopant-esque foot soldiers called . After achieving High Dope, he gained the ability to manipulate people's bodies like puppets.

Reactor Dopant
The  is a Dopant derived from a Silver Memory called the Reactor Memory that possesses a hot, hardened body, the ability to solidify the smoke produced from its head to use it like tentacles, and wields a mace in battle. As a side effect of using the Memory, the Dopant's heat remains in the user's body for some time and can burn them to death if they are separated from their Memory. The Reactor Dopant also commands an army of Road Dopants and manages Shadow Fuuto's energy infrastructure.

Mamoru Nikaido
 is a muscle-bound semi-executive member of Street who requires cooling equipment due to the Reactor Memory's side effects. After achieving High Dope, he gained the ability to fire powerful energy beams from his eyes. He is defeated by Kamen Rider W before sacrificing himself to stop his men from luring the Kamen Riders into Shadow Fuuto.

Hikaru Futami
 is a young executive member of Street and Nikaido's replacement. He was formerly a low-level member of the Seiengun gang and possessor of one of two Crab Memories who was defeated by Kamen Rider W alongside his gang leader, Tetsuo Fubuki, who Hikaru murdered.

Unlike his predecessor, Hikaru utilizes a Gaia Driver Rex in conjunction with his Reactor Memory to transform and can release excess heat while reverting to his human form.

Road Dopants
The  are Dopants derived from Road Memories that possess powerful jaws with multiple rows of teeth, the ability to slice through space using ultra-high speed and temperatures to generate black roads leading into Shadow Fuuto, and the ability to generate energy wheels of variable size from their wrists capable of slicing targets and burning flesh. Due to the aforementioned roads being made from the user's body, their flesh is consumed with each generation and most users become cannibals to replenish their energy, gradually losing their minds in the process. While most Road Dopants serve Street as expendable foot soldiers and assist them in expanding Shadow Fuuto, a subordinate of corrupt entrepreneur , operates independently to commit a series of brutal murders to satisfy his appetite until Kamen Rider W defeats him.

Notes

References

W
Kamen Rider W
Kamen Rider W